Harry Ziegler is a historian, currently a senior lecturer at the University of Lincoln. He teaches continental European history of the 19th and 20th centuries, with an emphasis on their political and cultural aspects and interactions. His main focus has been with German history of the 1920s and 1930s, as well as exploring the relationship between popular fictions and the societies in which they are produced and consumed.

In the 2011 Lincoln Council elections he ran as the Trade Unionist and Socialist Coalition candidate.

Publications

"Anarchy and Order: Re-inventing the Medieval in contemporary popular narrative."
"History and Popular Fiction: Two Worlds Collide. A reply to Feilitzsch."
"Karl May — Plädoyer für einen kulturwissenschaftlichen Forschungsansatz."
"Karl May als Vertreter eines deutschen Nationalcharacters? Eine Antwort auf E. Renner."
"Renners Nationalcharacter oder: die Tücken akademischer Beweisführung."

References

Living people
British historians
Year of birth missing (living people)